The Jamaica Omnibus Service (JOS), operated a municipal bus service for the Kingston Metropolitan Area, from 1953 until it was wound up in 1983.

Pre JOS 
In June 1898, the existing mule car service in Kingston was phased out and a transition to electric trams, initially operated by the West India Electric Company and later by the Jamaica Public Service Company, was undertaken. This transition to the electric tram was completed on March 31, 1899. This tram service continued to operate, but the inflexibility of a tram service could not keep pace with a growing city, and the tram service ceased on August 7, 1948.

Kingston's first bus service operated by a company called Jamaica Utilities commenced on August 8, 1948. Initially communities served included, Rockfort, Hagley Park, Mountain View and Three Miles. The service operated by Jamaica Utilities was unsatisfactory, mainly due to the poor condition in which the fleet was maintained. Efforts to get overseas professional advisers was rejected by the House of Representatives as were efforts to get financial support from government.

The government eventually revoked the franchise of Jamaica Utilities, paving the way for the takeover of bus service in Kingston by the Jamaica Omnibus Service (JOS) on December 15, 1953.

Inception and Replacement 
At its inception in 1953 the JOS was owned and operated by the British Electric Traction Company Limited, until it was nationalized by the government of Jamaica in 1974. The JOS replaced the first operator of public bus transit services in Kingston, Jamaica Utilities. The JOS was replaced by a hodgepodge system of private operator owned buses, and franchisees, which provided very unreliable and unstructured services and was very unpopular with the public. In 1998, the Jamaica Urban Transit Company (JUTC) was established and continues operations presently.

Fleet and Infrastructure 

The JOS inherited a very dilapidated depot and bus infrastructure from Jamaica Utilities, and the JOS gradually built new facilities, including a depot at Lyndhurst Road and upgraded the existing depot on Industrial Terrace. The JOS also refurbished the existing US built fleet with British built Leyland Engines. By the late 1970s the entire fleet consisted of various models of British built Leyland buses.

Route Network 
At its peak, the JOS had a fleet of over 600 buses, and serviced an area ranging from Spanish Town and Portmore in St. Catherine in the western extremities of the Greater Kingston area, Border, Mt. Charles, Irish Town and Mavis Bank in north rural St. Andrew, Port Royal to the south, and Bull Bay (10 Miles) in east rural St. Andrew.

A partial listing of JOS routes;

References 

Bus operating companies
Transport in Jamaica
Companies of Jamaica